The Borscht Film Festival is a film festival organized by the Borscht Corporation held in Miami, Florida roughly every 18–24 months. The festival's mission is to tell Miami stories, forging the cinematic identity of the city. While most of the films screened are commissioned specifically for the festival by the Borscht Corporation, they also accept works where the subject matter or filmmaker has some tie to South Florida.

Known as "the weirdest film festival on the planet," the festival is characterized by a gonzo sensibility, sense of spectacle, and focus on regional storytelling. While critics of the festival point out its chaotic structure, they also acknowledge that it is part of an overall ethos that is "teeming with lunacy and inspired imagination." It has been lauded for its "visionary and experimental organizational methods” with Filmmaker Magazine going as far as to recognize it as the most conceptually bold film festival of its era, and also a reinvention of the concept of a film festival.

Over the years the festival grew from a small, one night underground screening of student films to an internationally recognized event that became influential in the world of independent film for its inspired programming and curatorial skills, supporting the early work of artists like Jillian Mayer, Barry Jenkins, Tarell Alvin McCraney, John Wilson, Terence Nance, Rachel Rossin, and more. Films that first played at the Borscht Festival later went on to screen at Cannes, Sundance, Toronto, SXSW, and various other festivals.

The Borscht Film Festival was founded by Lucas Levya and a group of New World School of the Arts alums in 2005.

History
The festival was founded by a group of New World School of the Arts students in 2004.

References

External links

Film festivals in Florida
Film festivals established in 2005
Culture of Miami
Tourist attractions in Miami
2005 establishments in Florida